Shin Ji-min (born January 8, 1991), better known mononymously as Jimin, is a South Korean rapper and singer. She was the leader and main rapper of the girl group AOA, which debuted in 2012 under FNC Entertainment. In 2015, Jimin was a semi-finalist in the first season of Unpretty Rapstar. During the show, she released several successful collaboration singles, most notably "Good Start" (with Seulong) and "Puss" (with Iron). Following allegations of bullying by former bandmate Kwon Mina, Jimin left the group and retired from the entertainment industry in July 2020. She returned to the entertainment industry in July 2022.

Early life
Jimin was born on January 8, 1991, in Seongnam, Gyeonggi, South Korea. She learned how to play the guitar, harmonica, and piano as a child. From her second year of middle school to her first year of high school, she studied abroad at a Chinese language school for two years. While in China, she also attended a practical music school.

Career

2012–2013: Debut with AOA

On July 30, 2012, Jimin made her debut as a leader of AOA on Mnet's M! Countdown with the song "Elvis" from their debut single album, Angels' Story. She is also part of band unit AOA Black, established in 2013.

2014–2016: Solo activities and Unpretty Rapstar
In early 2015, Jimin was part of the variety show Unpretty Rapstar, a spin-off of Show Me The Money. Unpretty Rapstar is a female rappers survival program. The show consists of a single-elimination competition through rap performances. During the show, Jimin released a few collaboration singles, such as "T4SA" with MC Meta and Nuck. Her song with Seulong, "Good Start", was produced by Verbal Jint and peaked at number two on the Gaon Singles Chart. "Puss", her rap battle song with rapper Iron during the semi-finals, peaked at number one on the Gaon Singles Chart. She was also a cast member of the variety show Off to School for four episodes, beginning March 17, 2015.

On April 28, Jimin and J.Don released the collaboration single "God". The song was produced by Rhymer of Brand New Music as part of FNC Entertainment's N Project. The song's music video was based on Game of Thrones.

Jimin debuted as a soloist on March 3, 2016, with the single "Call You Bae", featuring Exo's Xiumin. The single is the first release of Jimin's solo project #OOTD (Outfit of the Day).

2017–2020: Solo activities, bullying allegations and retirement from industry
In October 2017, Jimin released the single "Hallelujah", a Latin-pop influenced dance track, a collaboration with magazine W Korea.

Jimin sung the OST for tvN's A Korean Odyssey together with Seo Yu-na, the song is called "If You Were Me" and it was released on January 28, 2018.

On July 3, 2020, former AOA member Kwon Mina alleged in an Instagram post that Jimin had bullied her for a decade, which led to Kwon's withdrawal from the group in May 2019.  She posted a photo of her scarred wrist and claimed to have attempted suicide as a result of the bullying. Jimin reportedly responded to the accusations by posting the word "fiction" to her Instagram Stories before deleting it shortly after. Kwon criticized the post, stating, "Fiction? It's too scary to say it's fiction." The allegations led to Jimin's departure from the group and the halt of all her activities in the entertainment industry.

On January 13, 2022, FNC Entertainment announced that Jimin's contract with the company has expired.

2022–present: Return to the industry
After a three-year hiatus from the entertainment industry, it was announced on July 14, 2022, that Jimin had signed an exclusive contract with Alo Malo Entertainment, and will be making her return to the entertainment industry. In August 2022, Jimin joined the cast of JTBC's The Second World, a survival show for girl-group rappers.

Discography

Singles

Soundtrack appearances

Filmography

Television shows

Awards and nominations

References

External links

AOA (group) members
1991 births
Living people
People from Seongnam
K-pop singers
South Korean female idols
South Korean women pop singers
FNC Entertainment artists
Japanese-language singers of South Korea
Mandarin-language singers of South Korea
South Korean female models
South Korean television personalities
South Korean women rappers
South Korean hip hop singers
South Korean singer-songwriters
Unpretty Rapstar contestants
21st-century South Korean women singers
Weekly Idol members
South Korean women singer-songwriters